Tarcoola railway station is a railway station in the Australian state of South Australia located on the Trans-Australian Railway in the state's west.

History
The Trans-Australian Railway was built through Tarcoola in 1915, and in 1980 it became a junction station when the Adelaide–Darwin railway diverged from Tarcoola to Alice Springs. This was extended to Darwin in 2004. It was initially built as a standard gauge replacement for the Central Australia Railway.

There is a triangular junction at Tarcoola which joins Crystal Brook, Darwin and Perth. Another triangular junction at Crystal Brook joins Tarcoola, Adelaide and Sydney.

The station has two triangles, a smaller one for turning locomotives, and the larger one to the west of the town gives direct access from the Darwin line to the Trans-Australian Railway to Kalgoorlie. The latter has been put out of service.

The upgrade increased the maximum permitted axle load by four tonnes.

Services
The Ghan and the Indian Pacific passenger services pass through Tarcoola both running once per week in each direction all year round. The mail for Tarcoola arrives by train.

References

External links
Photo: Station building ca.1926-1940
Photo: Station building ca.1912
Flickr gallery

Railway stations in South Australia
Trans-Australian Railway
Far North (South Australia)